Dudor is a rural locality (a village) in Gus-Khrustalny District, Grigoryevskoye Rural Settlement, Vladimir Oblast, Russia. The population was 59 as of 2010.

Geography 
Dudor is located 28 km southeast of Gus-Khrustalny (the district's administrative centre) by road. Dmitriyevo is the nearest rural locality.

References 

Rural localities in Gus-Khrustalny District